Palpita margaritacea is a moth in the family Crambidae. It was described by Inoue in 1997. It is found in Australia, where it has been recorded from New South Wales, Queensland and the Australian Capital Territory.

Adults are white with a brown costa and a small brown spot near the middle of the forewings.

References

Moths described in 1997
Palpita
Moths of Australia